Megliadino San Vitale is a comune (municipality) in the Province of Padua in the Italian region Veneto, located about  southwest of Venice and about  southwest of Padua.

Megliadino San Vitale borders the following municipalities: Casale di Scodosia, Megliadino San Fidenzio, Piacenza d'Adige, Santa Margherita d'Adige.

References

Cities and towns in Veneto